Širine is a settlement in the region of Baranja, Croatia. Administratively, it is located in the Petlovac municipality within the Osijek-Baranja County. Population is 58 people.

History

Širine has existed as part of the settlement from 1869. It was formally established as an independent settlement in 1991, when it was separated from the territory of Šumarina.

Population

Ethnic composition, 1991. census

References

Literature

 Book: "Narodnosni i vjerski sastav stanovništva Hrvatske, 1880–1991: po naseljima, author: Jakov Gelo, izdavač: Državni zavod za statistiku Republike Hrvatske, 1998., ;

See also
Osijek-Baranja county
Baranja

Populated places in Osijek-Baranja County
Baranya (region)